Cobitis levantina is a species of ray-finned fish in the family Cobitidae.
It is found in Lebanon, Syria, and Turkey.
Its natural habitats are rivers, intermittent rivers, and irrigated land.
It is threatened by habitat loss.

References

Sources

Cobitis
Fish described in 1992
Taxonomy articles created by Polbot